David Pasqualucci (born 27 June 1996) is an Italian competitive archer. He won a silver medal in the men's team recurve at the 2015 World Championships, and also competed as a member of Italy's archery squad at the 2016 Summer Olympics. He currently trains under the tutelage of his coaches Fabio Pivari and Wietse van Alten, a Sydney 2000 Olympian from the Netherlands, for the Italian team, while shooting at the Tempio di Diana Archery Range in Rome.

Pasqualucci rose to prominence in the international archery scene at the 2015 World Championships in Copenhagen, Denmark. There, he and his compatriots Michele Frangilli and Mauro Nespoli, both of whom came as reigning Olympic champions from London 2012, capture a silver medal in the men's team recurve to secure a full quota spot for Rio 2016, despite losing the title 0–6 to the South Koreans.

At the 2016 Summer Olympics in Rio de Janeiro, Pasqualucci was selected to compete for the Italian archery squad, shooting in both individual and team tournaments. First, Pasqualucci managed to score 685 points out of a maximum 720 to lead the Italian trio for the third seed heading to the knockout stage, along with his team's score of 2,007 collected from the classification round. Looking forward to defend the men's team recurve title for Italy, Pasqualacci and his compatriots Nespoli and Marco Galiazzo received a bye for the quarterfinals as a third-seeded team, but suffered an untimely defeat to China in a 0–6 upset. Rebounding from his Italian team's quarterfinal exit, Pasqualacci quickly dispatched Malawi's Areneo David in straight sets to book the round two spot in the men's individual recurve, before he bowed out to the Spaniard Antonio Fernández at 2–6.

References

External links
 

Italian male archers
Living people
People from Frascati
1996 births
Archers at the 2015 European Games
Archers at the 2019 European Games
European Games medalists in archery
European Games bronze medalists for Italy
World Archery Championships medalists
Archers at the 2016 Summer Olympics
Olympic archers of Italy
Sportspeople from the Metropolitan City of Rome Capital
21st-century Italian people